The 1981 Toronto Argonauts finished in fourth place in the East Division with a 2–14 record and failed to make the playoffs.

Offseason

Regular season
In spite of a 2–14 record, the Argonauts actually ended their season occupying the final playoff spot in the East (the crossover rule, intended to prevent such a weak third place team from making the playoffs, had not yet been implemented). Had the Montreal Alouettes lost their final regular season game against the Ottawa Rough Riders, they would have also finished 2–14 in which case the Argonauts would have qualified has they had scored more points in head-to-head games. However, Montreal won their last game to finish 3–13 and in third place.

Standings

Schedule

Awards and honours

1981 CFL All-Stars
None

1981 Eastern All-Stars
RB – Cedric Minter, CFL Eastern All-Star
P – Zenon Andrusyshyn, CFL Eastern All-Star

References

Toronto Argonauts seasons
1981 Canadian Football League season by team